Crizam César de Oliveira Filho, better known as Zinho (born 17 June 1967), is a Brazilian football pundit and retired footballer.

Playing career

Club
Born in Nova Iguaçu, Rio de Janeiro, Zinho played club football in Brazil with Flamengo, Palmeiras, Grêmio, Cruzeiro and Nova Iguaçu. He also had spells abroad with Yokohama Flügels and Miami FC. Zinho won the Campeonato Brasileiro Série A four times (twice with Palmeiras, once with Flamengo and once with Cruzeiro) and won the Campeonato Carioca three times (all with Flamengo).

International
Zinho was a member of the Brazilian 1994 FIFA World Cup winning team. He also took part at the 1993 and 1995 Copa América with Brazil, winning a runners-up medal in the latter edition of the tournament, and was also a member of the Brazilian team that finished in third place at the
1998 CONCACAF Gold Cup. He was capped a total of 57 times between March 1989 and February 1998, scoring 7 goals. On 20 January 2010 he was ranked 23rd in the USL First Division Top 25 of the Decade, which announced a list of the best and most influential players of the previous decade.

Career statistics

Club

International

Honours

Club
Flamengo
Rio State Championship (3): 1986, 1991, 2004
Copa União (1):1987
Brazilian Cup (1): 1990
Brazilian National League Championship (1): 1992
Taça Guanabara (1): 2004

Palmeiras
São Paulo State Championship (2): 1993, 1994
Rio-SP Tournament (2): 1993, 1994
Brazilian National League Championship (2): 1993, 1994
Naranja Cup of Valencia (Spain): 1997
Brazilian Cup (1): 1998
Copa Mercosur (1): 1998
Copa Libertadores (1): 1999

Yokohama Flügels 
AFC Asian Cup Winners' Cup (1): 1995
Asian Super Cup (1): 1995

Grêmio
Rio Grande do Sul State Championship (1): 2001
Brazilian Cup (1): 2001

Cruzeiro
Brazilian National League Championship (1): 2003

Nova Iguaçu
Rio State Championship (2nd division): 2005

Unofficial tournaments
Flamengo
Colombino Trophy (1): 1988
Marlboro Cup (USA) (1): 1990
Hamburg City Tournament (1): 1989
Sharp Cup (Japan) (1): 1990
Amizade Tournament (1): 1992

International
Brazil
FIFA World Cup (1): 1994
Copa América (Runner-up): 1995
CONCACAF Gold Cup (3rd Place): 1998

Unofficial tournaments
Brazil
Rous Cup (London) (1): 1995

Individual
Placar  Bola de Prata (4): 1988, 1992, 1994, 1997
South American Team of the Year – 1994

References

External links

People from Nova Iguaçu
Living people
1967 births
Brazilian footballers
Brazilian football managers
Brazilian expatriate footballers
Campeonato Brasileiro Série A players
J1 League players
Expatriate footballers in Japan
1993 Copa América players
1994 FIFA World Cup players
1995 Copa América players
1998 CONCACAF Gold Cup players
Copa Libertadores-winning players
FIFA World Cup-winning players
Brazil international footballers
USL First Division players
Expatriate soccer players in the United States
CR Flamengo footballers
Sociedade Esportiva Palmeiras players
Yokohama Flügels players
Grêmio Foot-Ball Porto Alegrense players
Cruzeiro Esporte Clube players
Nova Iguaçu Futebol Clube players
Miami FC (2006) players
Brazilian beach soccer players
Nova Iguaçu Futebol Clube managers
Association football wingers
Association football midfielders
Brazilian expatriate sportspeople in the United States
Sportspeople from Rio de Janeiro (state)